Andrzej Fedorowicz (born 30 December 1950) is a Polish politician. He was elected to the Sejm on 25 September 2005, getting 12,752 votes in 24 Białystok district as a candidate from the League of Polish Families list.

He was also a member of Sejm 2001-2005.

See also
Members of Polish Sejm 2005-2007

External links
Andrzej Fedorowicz - parliamentary page - includes declarations of interest, voting record, and transcripts of speeches.

1950 births
Living people
People from Łomża
Members of the Polish Sejm 2005–2007
Members of the Polish Sejm 2001–2005
League of Polish Families politicians